Misia Love & Ballads: The Best Ballade Collection is Misia's third compilation album, released on June 16, 2004 by her previous label Arista Japan. It sold 54,107 copies in its first week and peaked at #1.

The album is certified Gold for shipment of 100,000 copies.

Track listing

Charts

Oricon sales chart

References

External links
Sony Music Online Japan : MISIA

Misia compilation albums
2004 compilation albums
Japanese-language compilation albums